The 2019–20 Third Division Football League was 6th season of the Dhaka Third Division Football League. The league was kicked off on 24 February and ended on 9 September 2021. A total of 18 football clubs are participated in the league.

Venue

Teams
18 teams divided into two groups for first phase. Top five teams of each group will qualify for the Super League phase. The draw held on 18 February, 2021.

First round

Group A

Group B

Super League

League table

References

Dhaka Third Division Football League
2019 in Bangladeshi football
2020 in Bangladeshi football
2019–20 in Asian association football leagues